The Tsukahara can refer to a specific vault and a family of vaults in artistic gymnastics.  The first Tsukahara vault was performed by (and named after) Mitsuo Tsukahara in 1972.

A Tsukahara vault consists of a half turn off the springboard onto the vault table, then a push backwards, usually into a back salto or layout.

In Japanese, this technique is known as a "Moonsault".

Variations 
Any vault that has a handspring with 1/4 - 1/2 turn onto the vault table into a salto backwards is classified as a Tsukahara vault.  Some variations on the Tsukahara vaults include:

 Kim - Tsukahara tucked or stretched with full twist (360°) off
 Zamolodchikova - Tsukahara stretched with a 2/1 turn (720°) off
 Phelps - a half turn onto the vault table, followed by a half turn off and into a front layout.

References

Vaults (gymnastics)